Tapati (tapatī) is a goddess in Hinduism. She is known also as the goddess of the river Tapati and mother-goddess of the South (home of the sun) where she brings heat to the earth. According to certain Hindu texts, Tapati was the daughter of Surya (the Sun god) and Chhaya, one of the wives of Surya. 

Tapati's name literally means the "warming", "the hot one", "burning one". It had been said that no one in three worlds could match her in beauty, having perfect features, and severe religious self-discipline. This name is possibly connected to that of the queen of the Scythian gods, Tabiti, and it is possible that there was originally a dominant fire goddess in ancient Proto-Indo-Iranian religion.

Legends
According to the Hindu texts Tapati was famous for her devotion and neither goddess, nor demon, nor Apsara nor Gandharva was her equal in beauty, disposition or knowledge of the vedas.

Tapati is originally mentioned in the Mahabharata two dozen times, as a wife of Samvarana having a son named Kuru (the founder of the Kuru dynasty and the Kuru Kingdom). The story of both characters has also been found in other Hindu texts such as Srimad-Bhagavatam & Purāṇam. According to these texts Tapati's home was situated on the banks of river Tapati .

In Mahabharata, Arjun asked Gandharva about the origin of the name Tapatya, so the Gandharva said that the sun had a beautiful daughter named Tapati, whom he was concerned to marry off. An early Kaurava king Samvarana worships the sun and was elected as her husband. One day out for hunting the king saw her and fell in love and proposed a marriage but she referred him to her father for his approval.

After that the king started to worship the sun and took the help of sage Vasistha and sent him before the sun, Vasistha then requested sun to approve the marriage of Samvarana and Tapati and the sun agreed to it.

According to the Hindu texts, Tapati has the following relatives: Surya is her father and Chhaya is her mother, she was the younger sister of Yami and had two brothers Shani and Yama.

Mode of Worship
Since the river Tapati was probably named after Tapati, people worship her both in the form of a goddess and in that of an important river having many admirable qualities, enumerated in Hindu texts.

References 

Hindu goddesses
Characters in the Mahabharata
Sea and river goddesses
Rigvedic rivers
Hindu pilgrimage sites
Water and Hinduism
Personifications of rivers